The Government of the Italian Social Republic held office from 23 September 1943 until  25 April 1945, a total of .

Government parties
The government was composed by the following party:

Composition

References

Italian governments
1943 establishments in Italy
1945 disestablishments in Italy
Cabinets established in 1943
Cabinets disestablished in 1945